Ashoka tree is a common name for two plants which are frequently confused with each other:

Saraca asoca, native to South Asia and western Myanmar
Saraca indica, native to eastern Myanmar and Southeast Asia
Monoon longifolium is sometimes called the "false ashoka"

Holy tree of the ancient Jains as well as Hindus.